Anselme Adrien Raymond Lévy called Adrien Vély or Vély (3 September 1864 – 30 May 1935) was a French journalist and playwright.

Life 
Born in the first arrondissement of Paris, a journalist, he wrote and performed his plays under the pseudonym of Vély. He also uses in the press the pseudonyms of Addé, Brioché and Plumquick. His plays were represented on the most important Parisian stages of the end of the 19th and the beginning of the 20th century.

He also wrote songs, novels and film scripts.

Work 
as playwright 
 1887: Valentine crue Zoé, comédie-vaudeville en 1 acte, avec Adrien Moch, au théâtre des Menus-Plaisirs (13 April)
 1892: La Petite Salammbô, parodie en 1 acte du roman de Gustave Flaubert, with Alévy, at Théâtre Déjazet (29 September)
 1892: Cligne en haut ! Cligne en bas !, revue de fin d'année en 1 acte et 2 tableaux, avec Alévy, music by Charles Raiter, at Concert-Parisien (15 December)
 1893: Veuve Prosper, successeur, opérette en 3 actes, avec Alévy, au Théâtre Déjazet (11 October)
 1893: Paris-Printemps, revue, avec Alévy, au théâtre d'Application
 1894: Napoléon intime, comédie en 1 acte, avec Alévy, au théâtre d'Amiens (9 juillet). Reprise au théâtre du Grand-Guignol in June 1897.
 1894: Paris-Trianon, revue en 2 actes et 3 tableaux, with Alévy, at Trianon-Concert (31 July)
 1894: Une Bonne soirée, opérette en 1 acte, with Alévy, music by Paul Marcelles, at Théâtre de l'Ambigu (21 December)
 1895: Paris-Montmartre, revue en deux actes, un prologue et six tableaux, avec Alévy
 1898: Paris qui trotte, revue à grand spectacle, with Alévy and Laurent Grillet, Nouveau-Cirque (8 February)
 1898: Une lecture, ou les Jolies filles du Marché des Innocents, one act comedy, Théâtre des Capucines (20 October)
 1900: Ya d'la femme, revue en deux actes et un tableau, with Victor de Cottens, music by Laurent Halet, at Concert Parisien (15 October) 
 1901: La revue des Variétés, three acts review, with Paul Gavault, at Théâtre des Variétés (11 December)
 1901: Bichette, three acts vaudeville, with Alexandre Fontanes, at Théâtre du Palais-Royal (19 September)
 1902: Les Aventures du capitaine Corcoran, play in 5 acts and 17 scenes based on the novel by Alfred Assollant, with Paul Gavault and Georges Berr, at Théâtre du Châtelet (30 October)
 1902: V'là l'métro !, revue in two acts and ten scenes, with Henry de Gorsse, at la Cigale (7 November)
 1902: Monsieur Tranquille, one act comedy, with Léon Miral, at Théâtre des Capucines (22 December)
 1903: Qu'est-ce qu'on risque ?, revue in two acts and ten scenes, with Charles Clairville, at la Cigale 
 1904: Pour trente-deux francs, one act play, with Léon Miral, at Théâtre des Capucines (21 April)
 1905: Une revue au Théâtre du Palais Royal, review in ten scenes including a prologue, with Pierre Veber, at Théâtre du Palais-Royal (1 December) 
 1905: Le Numéro 33, one act play, with Léon Miral, at Théâtre des Capucines (24 January)
 1906: English school, one act play, at Théâtre du Palais-Royal (4 May)
 1906: Ohé ! La r'vue du Français, revue locale et féerique en 3 actes et 7 tableaux, au Théâtre-Français de Bordeaux (23 December)
 1909: La Poire, pièce en 1 acte, with Léon Miral, at Théâtre des Capucines (25 April)
 1914: Le 1er janvier de la sous-préfète, one act comedy
 1916: Le Locataire est sans pitié, one act comedy, in verses
 1920: La Poupée américaine, three acts operetta, with Victor de Cottens, Armand Lévy and Fernand Rouvray, Alcazar de Brussels (19 February)
 1926: La Double gageure, unpublished comedy
 undated: Un directeur de naguère, at Théâtre Michel.
Novelist
 1894: Contes panachés, éditions Calmann-Lévy
 1902: L'Illustre Saint-Gratien, illustrations by Paul Destez, librairie Paul Ollendorf
 1909: Les petites amies de M. St-Gratien, illustrations by Paul Destez, librairie Paul Ollendorf
 1913: Saint-Gratien est dans nos murs !, illustrations by Paul Destez, librairie Paul Ollendorf
 1914: M. Schnitz et M. Schnatz, foreword by Hansi, illustrations by Paul Destez, librairie Paul Ollendorf
 1924: En voilà des histoires, éditions Ferenczi
 1924: La Plus aimée, éditions Albin Michel
 1924: Mlle Charlequine, poule, éditions Flammarion
Journalist
 1894: La Galerie des chefs-d’œuvre
 1921: La Grande détresse de la poésie française
 1929: Le Prix de français en Alsace, 6th year, 1929.
Screenwriter
 1908: , short film (250 m) by Georges Monca
 1909: Le Dîner du 9, short film (215 m) by an anonymous director
 1909: La Course au mouchoir, short film by an anonymous director
 1910: Amis de table d'hôte, short film by an anonymous director 
 1911: Pour voir Paris, short film by Albert Capellani
 1912: Zoé a le cœur trop tendre, short film (155 m)  by an anonymous director.

Awards 
 Chevalier de la Légion d'Honneur
 Officier d'Académie (ministerial order of 19 November 1889)
 Ordre des Palmes académiques (ministerial order of 17 January 1897)

References

Bibliography 
 Louis Bethléem, Romans à lire et romans à proscrire: essai de classification, 1925, 
 René Bellé, Andrée Fénelon Haas, Vingt contes du vingtième siècle, 1955,

External links 

20th-century French writers
French dramatists and playwrights
French male screenwriters
1864 births
1935 deaths
Writers from Paris